The 1915 Kansas State Aggies football team represented Kansas State Agricultural College—now known as Kansas State University—as a member of the Missouri Valley Conference (MVC) during the 1915 college football season. Led by John R. Bender in his first and only season as head coach, the Aggies compiled an overall record of 3–4–1 with a mark of 0–2–1 in conference play, placing last out of seven teams in the MVC.

Schedule

References

Kansas State
Kansas State Wildcats football seasons
Kansas State Aggies football